Kashinath is a 1943 Bollywood drama film, directed by Nitin Bose. It stars Bharati Devi, Sunanda Devi, Manorama, Asit Baren, Bijlee, Latika Malik, Nemo, Budhdev and more.

Cast
 Asit Baran  (Kashinath)  
 Sunanda Devi (Kamala)
 Bharati Devi (Bindu)
 Nemo (Manager)
 Nawab (Pitambar Chakravarty)
 Dilip Bose (Binode)

Soundtrack

External links

References

1943 films
1940s Hindi-language films
Indian drama films
Films scored by Pankaj Mullick